Brtnice is a town in Jihlava District in the Vysočina Region of the Czech Republic. It has about 3,800 inhabitants. The historic town centre is well preserved and is protected by law as an urban monument zone.

Administrative parts
Villages of Dolní Smrčné, Jestřebí, Komárovice, Malé, Panská Lhota, Přímělkov, Příseka, Střížov and Uhřínovice are administrative parts of Brtnice.

Geography

It lies in the Křižanov Highlands. The eponymous river Brtnice flows through the town.

History
The first written mention of Brtnice is from 1234, when it was donated to convent in Předklášteří by King Wenceslaus I. From 1410 until 1623, it was owned by the lords of Brtnický of Waldstein. During their rule, Brtnice prospered and the castle was built. In 1588, a church, that time consecrated to Saint Matthias, was built next to the castle.

After 1623, Brtnice was acquired by Italian noble family of Collalto et San Salvatore, which owned it until 1945. This family also cultivated Brtnice. The family had built a monastery and had rebuilt the castle, interiors of the church, and houses on the square in Renaissance and Baroque styles.

Sights

The historic centre and the main square are divided by the Brtnice River. There are two Baroque bridges over the river. One of the bridges, so-called Jewish Bridge, connected the town with the Jewish quarter and is only half decorated with statues. Apart from the bridges, the main landmark of the Svobody Square is the Renaissance town hall from 1580.

The large birth house of the architect Josef Hoffmann on the town square belongs to main tourist destinations. Following a 1992 exhibition in Brtnice on Hoffmann's work mounted by the town and MAK in Vienna, the house was turned into a permanent exhibition space. From 2006, the building has been administered by the Moravian Gallery in Brno, with the assistance of MAK.

Near the square is the Church of Saint James the Great. It is a simple Baroque building from 1776–1784 which replaced an original medieval building. The church containts valuable artworks.

The Brtnice Castle is located on a hill above the town centre. It is a unique large complex of Renaissance castle with Baroque modifications from 1650–1655, surrounded by Gothic fortifications, with English style castle park founded in 1817. The castle contains expositions on medieval torture and history of plague epidemics. Next to the castle complex is the former Minims monastery with Church of Blessed Giuliana of Collalto.

The ruin of the Rokštejn Castle is located near the Panská Lhota village. The early Gothic castle was conquered and demolished in the 15th century by Matthias Corvinus and his army.

Notable people
Hermann of Solms-Hohensolms-Lich (1838–1899), German nobleman and politician
Josef Hoffmann (1870–1956), Austrian architect
Gustav Haloun (1898–1951), sinologist
Baruch Kurzweil (1907–1972), Israeli literary critic
William Pachner (1915–2017), American painter
Zdeněk Měřínský (1948–2016), archeologist and historian; died here

Twin towns – sister cities

Brtnice is twinned with:
 Orpund, Switzerland

References

External links

Cities and towns in the Czech Republic
Populated places in Jihlava District